The 2022 Glastonbury Festival of Contemporary Performing Arts took place between 22 and 26 June. The three headlining acts were Billie Eilish, Kendrick Lamar and Paul McCartney, with Diana Ross performing in the Legend's slot.

This is the first in-person festival since 2019 with the previous two editions being cancelled due to the COVID-19 pandemic, known as enforced "fallow" years.

Background
Following the conclusion of the 2019 Glastonbury Festival on 30 June 2019, it was announced that plans were underway for the 2020 Festival, which would celebrate Glastonbury's 50th anniversary. Headliners Paul McCartney, Kendrick Lamar and Taylor Swift, along with Diana Ross in the Legend's slot, were announced alongside a host of other acts. However, as the COVID-19 pandemic began to worsen, the ability for the festival to go ahead was put into doubt. Emily Eavis stated in an interview on 12 March 2020, that she was hopeful that the festival would not be cancelled but just six days later on 18 March 2020, 5 days prior to the first UK COVID-19 lockdown, Glastonbury officially announced that the 2020 edition which was due to celebrate its 50th anniversary would be cancelled. As a replacement to the festival, Worthy Farm recorded several short sets with artists in a COVID-safe environment and broadcast them together as a film titled Live from Worthy Farm which streamed on both the Glastonbury website and BBC Two. Due to continued uncertainty around the pandemic, the 2021 Glastonbury Festival was also cancelled.

In October 2021, Billie Eilish was announced as one of the 2022 headliners, replacing Swift and becoming the youngest headliner in the festival's history. The first wave of the line-up was announced on 4 March 2022, revealing that McCartney, Lamar and Ross would still be performing in their previously confirmed roles. The rest of the line-up was released on 30 May 2022.

Tickets
General admission tickets for the festival cost £280 for the full weekend and sold out.

Weather
The weather was around 20 °C on 22 June the first day of the festival with some light rain on the Friday, Saturday, and Sunday with peak temperatures of 18 to 20 °C.

Line-up

Pyramid stage

A. Billie Eilish's set also featured her brother Finneas O'Connell. 
B. Easy Life's set featured an appearance from Kevin Abstract. 
C. AJ Tracey's set featured an appearance from Aitch. 
D. Haim's set was preceded by an appearance from Greta Thunberg. 
E. Paul McCartney's set featured appearances by Dave Grohl and Bruce Springsteen. 
F. Herbie Hancock's set featured Terence Blanchard. 
G. Lorde's set featured appearances by Clairo and Arlo Parks.

Other stage

A. Blossoms' set featured an appearance by Melanie C. 
B. Olivia Rodrigo's set featured an appearance by Lily Allen. 
C. Pet Shop Boys' set featured an appearance by Olly Alexander.

West Holts stage

A. Little Simz' set featured an appearance from Cleo Sol. 
B. Angélique Kidjo's set featured an appearance from Shabaka Hutchings.

John Peel stage

A. Phoebe Bridgers' set featured an appearance from Arlo Parks. 
B. The Jesus and Mary Chain's set featured an appearance from Bridgers. 
C. Ghetts' set featured appearances from Moonchild Sanelly and Pa Salieu. 
D. Jamie T's set featured an appearance from Hugo White. 
E. Charli XCX's set featured an appearance from Caroline Polachek.

Park stage

A. Khruangbin's set featured an appearance by Leon Bridges.

Acoustic stage

Avalon stage

Left Field

References

External links

2022 in British music
2022 in England
2010s in Somerset
2022
June 2022 events in the United Kingdom